Jameel Badih Massouh (born September 12, 1984) is a retired American mixed martial artist. A professional from 2005 until 2011, he fought in the WEC, Bellator, Pancrase, and King of the Cage.

Mixed martial arts career

Early career
After making his professional debut in early 2005, compiling an undefeated 11–0 record before being defeated by veteran Tristan Yunker.

World Extreme Cagefighting
Massouh made his WEC debut on April 5, 2009 losing via unanimous decision to Raphael Assunção at WEC 40.

Massouh was defeated by WEC newcomer Erik Koch on December 19, 2009 at WEC 45.

He lost to Michael Mananquil via split decision in the quarter-finals of the 2013 Road To Glory USA 70kg Tournament in Milwaukee, Wisconsin on May 11, 2013.

Personal life
He is of Lebanese and Scotch-Irish descent.

Kickboxing record

|-
|-  bgcolor="#FFBBBB"
| 2013-05-11 || Loss ||align=left| Michael Mananquil || Road to Glory USA 70 kg Tournament, Quarter Finals || Milwaukee, Wisconsin, USA || Decision (split) || 3 || 3:00 || 0-1
|-
|-
| colspan=9 | Legend:

Mixed martial arts record

|-
| Loss
| align=center| 26–9
| John Cholish
| Submission (guillotine choke)
| CFFC 9: Beach Brawl	 	
| 
| align=center| 2
| align=center| 2:25
| Atlantic City, New Jersey, United States
| 
|-
| Win
| align=center| 26–8
| Steve Kinnison
| Submission (twister)
| KOTC: Outkasts
| 
| align=center| 1
| align=center| 1:27
| Lac du Flambeau, Wisconsin, United States
| 
|-
| Loss
| align=center| 25–8
| Rolando Delgado
| Decision (unanimous)
| Bellator 37	 	
| 
| align=center| 3
| align=center| 5:00
| Concho, Oklahoma, United States
| 
|-
| Win
| align=center| 25–7 
| Chico Camus
| Decision (unanimous)
| NAFC: Badd Blood 	
| 
| align=center| 3
| align=center| 5:00
| Milwaukee, Wisconsin, United States
| 
|-
| Win
| align=center| 24–7 
| Nick Mamalis
| Submission (guillotine choke)
| Bellator 29	 	
| 
| align=center| 1
| align=center| 4:27
| Milwaukee, Wisconsin, United States
| 
|-
| Win
| align=center| 23–7 
| Mike Erosa
| Submission
| Maxx FC 9: Fighting Fathers
| 
| align=center| 2
| align=center| 0:36
| San Juan, Puerto Rico
| 
|-
| Win
| align=center| 22–7 
| Sami Aziz	
| Decision (unanimous)
| Superior Challenge 5	
| 
| align=center| 3
| align=center| 5:00
| Stockholm, Sweden
| Won the Superior Challenge Featherweight Championship. 
|-
| Loss
| align=center| 21–7
| Erik Koch
| Decision (unanimous)
| WEC 45
| 
| align=center| 3
| align=center| 5:00
| Las Vegas, Nevada, United States
| 
|-
| Loss
| align=center| 21–6
| Leonard Garcia
| Decision (split)
| WEC 42
| 
| align=center| 3
| align=center| 5:00
| Las Vegas, Nevada, United States
| 
|-
| Loss
| align=center| 21–5
| Raphael Assunção
| Decision (unanimous)
| WEC 40
| 
| align=center| 3
| align=center| 5:00
| Chicago, Illinois, United States
| 
|-
| Win
| align=center| 21–4
| Vladimir Zenin
| Submission (rear-naked choke)
| fightFORCE: Day of Anger
| 
| align=center| 2
| align=center| 2:26
| Saint Petersburg, Russia
| 
|-
| Win
| align=center| 20–4
| Masaya Takita
| TKO (punches)
| Pancrase: Changing Tour 1
| 
| align=center| 1
| align=center| 2:30
| Tokyo, Japan
| 
|-
| Win
| align=center| 19–4
| Shinya Kumazawa
| Submission (triangle choke)
| Gekitotsu: Clash the Nations 1
| 
| align=center| 2
| align=center| 2:54
| Kumamoto, Kumamoto, Japan
| 
|-
| Win
| align=center| 18–4
| Ryan Healy
| Decision (unanimous)
| EVO MMA: Evolution MMA
| 
| align=center| 3
| align=center| 5:00
| Phoenix, Arizona, United States
| 
|-
| Win
| align=center| 17–4
| Mike Suttles
| Submission (arm-triangle choke)
| FCC 36: Freestyle Combat Challenge 36
| 
| align=center| 1
| align=center| N/A
| Racine, Wisconsin, United States
| 
|-
| Loss
| align=center| 16–4
| Clay French
| Submission (rear-naked choke)
| Adrenaline MMA: Guida vs. Russow
| 
| align=center| 2
| align=center| 3:17
| Chicago, Illinois, United States
| 
|-
| Win
| align=center| 16–3
| Myles Merola
| Decision (unanimous)
| HCF: Crow's Nest
| 
| align=center| 3
| align=center| 5:00
| Gatineau, Quebec, Canada
| 
|-
| Win
| align=center| 15–3
| Craig Howard
| Submission (armbar)
| FCC 33: Freestyle Combat Challenge 33
| 
| align=center| 1
| align=center| 1:11
| Racine, Wisconsin, United States
| 
|-
| Loss
| align=center| 14–3
| Miki Shida
| Decision (unanimous)
| Pancrase: Rising 10
| 
| align=center| 2
| align=center| 5:00
| Tokyo, Japan
| 
|-
| Win
| align=center| 14–2
| David Messiahs
| TKO
| FCC 29: Freestyle Combat Challenge 29
| 
| align=center| 1
| align=center| N/A
| Racine, Wisconsin, United States
| 
|-
| Win
| align=center| 13–2
| Elton Chavez
| KO (kick)
| MT 12: Madtown Throwdown 12
| 
| align=center| 2
| align=center| 0:21
| Madison, Wisconsin, United States
| 
|-
| Loss
| align=center| 12–2
| Daiki Hata
| TKO (injury)
| Pancrase: Rising 5
| 
| align=center| 2
| align=center| 4:50
| Tokyo, Japan
| 
|-
| Win
| align=center| 12–1
| Dustin Neace
| Decision (unanimous)
| FCC 26: Freestyle Combat Challenge 26
| 
| align=center| 3
| align=center| N/A
| Racine, Wisconsin, United States
| 
|-
| Loss
| align=center| 11–1
| Tristan Yunker
| Submission (armbar)
| FCC 25: Freestyle Combat Challenge 25
| 
| align=center| 1
| align=center| N/A
| Racine, Wisconsin, United States
| 
|-
| Win
| align=center| 11–0
| Dustin Neace
| Submission
| DFC 1: Diesel Fighting Championships 1
| 
| align=center| 3
| align=center| 4:50
| Dallas, Texas, United States
| 
|-
| Win
| align=center| 10–0
| Mike Lambrecht
| TKO
| MT 7: Madtown Throwdown 7
| 
| align=center| N/A
| align=center| N/A
| Madison, Wisconsin, United States
| 
|-
| Win
| align=center| 9–0
| Jim Bruketta
| Decision (unanimous)
| FCC 22: Freestyle Combat Challenge 22
| 
| align=center| 2
| align=center| 5:00
| Racine, Wisconsin, United States
| 
|-
| Win
| align=center| 8–0
| Greg Klemp
| Submission (rear-naked choke)
| MT 6: Madtown Throwdown 6
| 
| align=center| N/A
| align=center| N/A
| Madison, Wisconsin, United States
| 
|-
| Win
| align=center| 7–0
| Josh Pankey
| TKO
| FCC 21: Freestyle Combat Challenge 21 
| 
| align=center| 1
| align=center| N/A
| Racine, Wisconsin, United States
| 
|-
| Win
| align=center| 6–0
| Greg Klemp
| Submission (rear-naked choke)
| MT 5: Madtown Throwdown 5
| 
| align=center| N/A
| align=center| N/A
| Madison, Wisconsin, United States
| 
|-
| Win
| align=center| 5–0
| Justin Coates
| TKO
| FCC 20: Freestyle Combat Challenge 20
| 
| align=center| N/A
| align=center| N/A
| Racine, Wisconsin, United States
| 
|-
| Win
| align=center| 4–0
| Eugene Crisler
| Submission (triangle choke)
| MT 4: Madtown Throwdown 4
| 
| align=center| N/A
| align=center| N/A
| Madison, Wisconsin, United States
| 
|-
| Win
| align=center| 3–0
| Devon Green
| Submission (triangle choke)
| MT 3: Madtown Throwdown 3
| 
| align=center| N/A
| align=center| N/A
| Madison, Wisconsin, United States
| 
|-
| Win
| align=center| 2–0
| Chaylen Rader
| Submission (rear-naked choke)
| FCC 18: Freestyle Combat Challenge 18
| 
| align=center| 1
| align=center| N/A
| Racine, Wisconsin, United States
| 
|-
| Win
| align=center| 1–0
| Robert Mrotek
| TKO (punches)
| MT 2: Madtown Throwdown 2
| 
| align=center| N/A
| align=center| N/A
| Madison, Wisconsin, United States
|

References

External links

Jameel Massouh's WEC profile

American male mixed martial artists
Mixed martial artists from Wisconsin
Featherweight mixed martial artists
American male kickboxers
Kickboxers from Wisconsin
Middleweight kickboxers
Sportspeople from Milwaukee
American people of Lebanese descent
American people of Scotch-Irish descent
1984 births
Living people
Sportspeople of Lebanese descent